I Am the Cosmos is the only solo album by the American pop-rock musician Chris Bell, posthumously released in 1992 by Rykodisc, having been recorded over a period of two to three years during the mid-1970s. Bell had previously been a member of Big Star.

In 2009, the album was remastered and re-released in a deluxe two-CD version by Rhino Handmade with alternate versions and additional tracks, and three songs by Bell's pre-Big Star groups, Icewater and Rock City. Some copies included a bonus 7" single of "I Am the Cosmos"/"You and Your Sister", a replica of the original single.

The booklet notes for the album were written by Bell's brother David, who also took the photographs used on the cover and in the CD booklet. The cover features a picture that was taken near Nendaz in Switzerland, it shows the opposite side of the valley with Ardon and the south flank of the snowy massif of Les Diablerets in the back.

The 2017 Omnivore Recordings edition comprises 35 tracks, including eight previously unreleased tracks and two that appear on CD for the first time. Three pre-Big Star tunes that appeared on the 2009 edition are omitted; these are now found on Omnivore's Looking Forward: The Roots of Big Star (also 2017).

Cover versions and other uses
"Speed of Sound" was used over the opening credits of the Peter Sollett film Nick and Norah's Infinite Playlist. This song also featured on the various artists compilation album compiled by The Flaming Lips, Late Night Tales: The Flaming Lips.

"I Am the Cosmos" has been played live by Big Star, Beck, The Posies, Gigolo Aunts, The Jayhawks, and The Drams, and has also been covered by This Mortal Coil, together with a version of "You and Your Sister". Scarlett Johansson and Pete Yorn recorded "I Am the Cosmos" for their 2009 album Break Up.

"I Am the Cosmos" is mentioned in the song "Paradise" on Richard Ashcroft's 2002 album Human Conditions.

"There Was a Light" was used in the soundtrack to the Patriot (TV series) 2018 episode "Loaded."

Track listing
All songs written by Chris Bell.

Rykodisc CD, 1992
"I Am the Cosmos" – 3:46
"Better Save Yourself" – 4:25
"Speed of Sound" – 5:11
"Get Away" – 3:26
"You and Your Sister" – 3:11
"Make a Scene" – 4:09
"Look Up" – 3:14
"I Got Kinda Lost" – 2:42
"There Was a Light" – 3:19
"Fight at the Table" – 3:41
"I Don't Know" – 3:22
"Though I Know She Lies" – 3:35

Bonus tracks
"I Am the Cosmos" (slow version) – 3:40
"You and Your Sister" (country version) – 2:56
"You and Your Sister" (acoustic version) – 2:53

Rhino Handmade 2CD, 2009 (bonus tracks)
"Looking Forward" – 3:39 by Icewater
"Sunshine" – 1:45 by Icewater
"My Life Is Right" – 3:08 by Rock City
"I Don't Know" (alternate version) – 4:18
"You and Your Sister" (alternate version) – 3:03
"I Am the Cosmos" (extended alternate version) – 5:07 (full length version of the above-mentioned "I Am the Cosmos" (slow version))
"Speed of Sound" (alternate version) – 5:13
"Fight at the Table" (alternate mix) – 4:11
"Make a Scene" (alternate mix) – 4:11
"Better Save Yourself" (alternate mix) – 4:29
"Get Away" (alternate version) – 4:21
"You and Your Sister" (acoustic version) – 3:00
"Stay with Me" – 2:49 with Keith Sykes
"In My Darkest Hour" – 3:01 with Nancy Bryan
"Clacton Rag" – 3:30

Omnivore 2CD, 2017

Disc 1
"I Am the Cosmos" (Original Single Version)
"Better Save Yourself"
"Speed of Sound"
"Get Away"
"You and Your Sister" (Original Single Version)
"I Kinda Got Lost"
"Look Up"
"Make a Scene"
"There Was a Light"
"I Don’t Know"
"Fight at the Table"
"Though I Know She Lies"
"I Am the Cosmos" (Acoustic Mix) *
"You and Your Sister" (Acoustic Version)
"Look Up" (Acoustic Movie Mix) *
"Untitled Acoustic Instrumental" (Movie Mix)

Disc 2
"I Am the Cosmos" (Extended Alternate Version)
"Better Save Yourself" (Alternate Mix)
"Speed of Sound" (Alternate Version)
"Get Away" (Alternate Version)
"You and Your Sister" (Alternate Version)
"Make a Scene" (Alternate Mix)
"Fight At the Table" (Alternate Mix)
"I Don’t Know" (Alternate Version)
"Speed of Sound" (Alternate Version Backing Track) *
"Stay with Me" (with Keith Sykes)
"In My Darkest Hour" (with Nancy Bryan)
"So Long Baby (a.k.a. Clacton Rag)"
"Fight at the Table" (Outtake with Partial Vocal) *
"You and Your Sister" (“Country” Underdub Mix)
"Get Away" (Outtake Track) *
"Better Save Yourself" (Outtake Track) *
"I Am the Cosmos" (Alternate Backing Track with Piano) *
"Untitled Electric Instrumental" (Movie Mix) *
"Though I Know She Lies" (Movie Mix) *

previously unreleased

Personnel
[Details from the 2009 edition]
Chris Bell – guitar, vocals
Ken Woodley – bass guitar, organ
Richard Rosebrough – drums
Jody Stephens – drums
Alex Chilton – backing vocals on track 5, guitar on track 26
Bill Cunningham – arrangement on track 5
Jim Dickinson – piano on track 10
Original album recorded at Château d'Hérouville, France except:
Track 5 recorded at Ardent Studios, Memphis, Tennessee
Tracks 1, 8 & 11 recorded at Shoe Studios & Productions, Memphis, Tennessee by Warren Wagner.
Digital mastering – Dr. Toby Mountain at Northeastern Digital Recording, Inc., Southborough, Massachusetts
NoNoise Processing on selected tracks by Scott Leviton at Fantasy Studios, Berkeley, California
Package design – Steven Jurgensmeyer
Photography and booklet notes – David Bell

References

1992 debut albums
Rykodisc albums
Rhino Handmade albums
Albums published posthumously
Big Star
Chris Bell (American musician) albums
Omnivore Recordings albums